Acraea atolmis, the scarlet acraea, is a butterfly in the family Nymphalidae. It is found in western Zimbabwe, Botswana, northern Namibia, western Zambia, the southern and western part of the DRC and Angola.

Description

A. atolmis Westw. agrees very closely with A. nohara and only differs essentially in having the veins of the hindwing black in the distal part and in the entire absence of the marginal band of the hindwing on both surfaces. Damaraland, Rhodesia, Angola and the southern Congo. - f. acontias Westw. (55 c as atolmis) is the rainy-season form and differs in having all the black dots larger and particularly in the hindwing having a distinct marginal band, though only 1 mm. in breadth, above unspotted, beneath enclosing narrow, transversely placed rectangular whitish marginal spots. The female has the ground-colour of both wings brown to black-grey. - ab. decora Weym. is a melanotic aberration of the in which the middle of the fore wing above is blackish. Angola.

Biology
The habitat consists of deciduous woodland.

Adults are on wing year round.

The larvae feed on Triumfetta species.

Taxonomy
It is a member of the Acraea cepheus species group. See also Pierre & Bernaud, 2014.

References

External links

Images representing Acraea atolmis at Bold
Die Gross-Schmetterlinge der Erde 13: Die Afrikanischen Tagfalter. Plate XIII 55 c

Butterflies described in 1881
atolmis
Butterflies of Africa
Taxa named by John O. Westwood